1983 is the debut studio album by American music producer Steven Ellison, under his moniker Flying Lotus. It was released by Plug Research on October 3, 2006. The album is named after Ellison's year of birth.

Critical reception

Marisa Brown of AllMusic gave the album 3.5 stars out of 5, writing, "It's controlled and circular but also very warm and expressive, able to have fun, to not take itself too seriously." Chet Betz of Cokemachineglow commented that "1983 isn't very obvious about envelope-pushing, yet it's rare that an instrumental hip-hop album can remain eminently listenable while standing so firm in character and purpose, ontological towards its subgenre without forgetting to funk, simultaneously without milking the funk for its more shameless immediacies." Dave Segal of XLR8R called the album "a rare species of cosmic underground hip-hop." He added, "Flying Lotus combines Madlib's affinity for jazzy arrangements and chord progressions, Nobody's and Daedelus' psychedelic textural proclivities, and J Dilla's economical, dusted funkiness." Meanwhile, Brian Howe of Pitchfork gave the album a 5.8 out of 10, stating, "like an overly workshopped novel, the album is stylish, well-turned, and interchangeable with its peers."

In 2017, Ammar Kalia of Clash wrote, "Composed using a patchwork of influences ranging from jazz harp to Japanese synthpop, Afro-Cuban rhythm and distorted game sounds, it serves as a mission statement, setting the tone for Ellison's future works."

Track listing

Personnel
Credits adapted from liner notes.

 Flying Lotus – music
 Laura Darlington – vocals (10)
 Daedelus – remix (11)
 Kelly Hibbert – mastering
 Brandy Flower – artwork

References

External links
 
 1983 at Plug Research

2006 albums
Flying Lotus albums
Plug Research albums
Instrumental hip hop albums
Albums produced by Flying Lotus